The UCPH Department of Biology (Danish: Biologisk Institut) is a department under the Faculty of Science at University of Copenhagen (UCPH). It is organized in 10 sections and is also involved in a number of research centres. The department offer three BSc and four MSc degree programmes. With 400 employees and 1,800 students, it is the largest department at the faculty. It also operates the Øresund Aquarium in Helsingør.

History
On January 1, 2004, the Botanical Institute and Zoological Institute merged into the Department of Biology, while the four museums Botanical Garden, Botanical Museum and Library, Geological Museum and Zoological Museum
merged as Natural History Museum of Denmark.

Organisation

Sections
Biomolecular Sciences
Cell Biology and Neurobiology
Cell Biology and Physiology
Computational and RNA Biology
Ecology and Evolution
Freshwater Biology
Functional Genomics
Marine Biology
Microbiology
Terrestrial Ecology

Research centers
Research centres hosted by the Department of Biology:
 Centre for Bacterial Stress Response and Persistence (BASP)
 Center for Computational and Applied Transcriptomics (COAT)
 Center for Functional and Comparative Insect Genomics
 Centre for Social Evolution (CSE)
 Danish Archaea Centre (DAC) 
 Linderstrøm-Lang Centre for Protein Science

External research centres:
 Center for Chromosome Stability 
 Centre for Permafrost (CENPERM)
 Centre for Lake Restoration (CLEAR)
 P´*olar Science Center

Location
Most of the department is based in the University Park, part of University of Copenhagen's North Campus. Buildings used by the department include Copenhagen Biocenter (Ole Maaløes Vej 5), the August Krogh Building (Universitetsparken 13) or the adjacent buildings 1 and 3 (Universitetsparken 15) and the BIO-Aqua building (Building 20, Universitetsparken 4).

The Marine Biological Laboratory is located in Helsingør. The premises are located in association with the Øresund Aquarium. The complex is located near the city's North Harbour (Strandpromenaden 5) and was adapted to design by Rørbæk og Møller Arkitekter in 2015.

Programmes
The department offers the following BSc degree programmes:
Biology (in Danish) 
Biochemistry (in Danish) 
Molecular Biomedicine (in Danish)

MSc degrees  
Biology  
Biochemistry  
Molecular Biomedicine
Bioinformatics

References

External links

University of Copenhagen